The Cambodia national basketball team  represents Cambodia in international basketball competitions and is managed by the Cambodian Basketball Federation (CBF).
At the 2015 Southeast Asian Games, Cambodia had its best performance ever.

Kit
Nike 2005

Results

Summer Olympics
yet to qualify

FIBA Basketball World Cup
yet to qualify

FIBA Asia Cup

 Champions   Runners up   Third place   Fourth place

Asian Games

 Champions   Runners up   Third place   Fourth place

SEABA Championship

 Champions   Runners up   Third place   Fourth place

Southeast Asian Games

 Champions   Runners up   Third place   Fourth place

Team

Current roster
Team for the 2019 Southeast Asian Games:

Depth chart

Past Rosters
Scroll down to see more.
Team for the 2015 Southeast Asian Games:

Team for the 2017 Southeast Asian Games:

Head coach position
 Austin Koledoye – 2009-2017
 Ed Scollan – 2019-present

3x3 Team
For the first time in history, Cambodia will feature both a "regular" 5x5 basketball team and a 3x3 basketball team at the 2021 Southeast Asian Games.

See also
Cambodia women's national basketball team
Cambodia national under-18 basketball team

References

External links
Cambodia Basketball Federation at fiba.com
Rank at fiba.com
Cambodian team on Asia-basket.com 
Cambodia National Basketball Team 2015 - Facebook account
Cambodia Basketball Federation - Facebook account
Basketball Mens Singapore vs Cambodia (Day 6) | 28th SEA Games Singapore 2015 Youtube.com video

1958 establishments in Cambodia
 
Men's national basketball teams